Power Le Poer Trench (1770–1839) was an Anglican clergyman who served in the Church of Ireland as firstly Bishop of Waterford and Lismore, then Bishop of Elphin and finally Archbishop of Tuam.

Life
He was the second son of William Trench, 1st Earl of Clancarty, and younger brother of Richard Trench, 2nd Earl of Clancarty. Born in Sackville Street, Dublin, on 10 June 1770, he was first educated at a preparatory school at Putney, whence he went for a short time to Harrow, and afterwards at the academy of Mr. Ralph at Castlebar, in the immediate neighbourhood of his home. Trench matriculated at Trinity College, Dublin, on 2 July 1787, where his tutor was Matthew Young, afterwards bishop of Clonfert and Kilmacduagh, and graduated B.A. on 13 July 1791. Later in the same year (27 November) Trench was ordained deacon, and, having received priest's orders on 24 June 1792, he was in the same month inducted into the benefice of Creagh, in which his father's residence and the great fair town of Ballinasloe were situated. In the following year (5 November 1793) he was presented to the benefice of Rawdenstown, County Meath. He obtained a faculty to hold the two cures together, and combined with their clerical duties the business of agent on his father's Galway estate. Trench was a man of great bodily strength and a fine horseman, and he retained a fondness for field sports to the end of his days. During the Irish rebellion of 1798 he acted as a captain in the local yeomanry raised by his father to resist the French invading army under Humbert.

In 1802 Trench was appointed to the see of Waterford, in succession to Richard Marlay, and was consecrated on 21 November 1802. In 1810 he was translated to the bishopric of Elpin, and, on the death of Archbishop Beresford, was on 4 October 1819 advanced to the archepiscopal see of Tuam. In May 1834, on the death of James Verschoyle, the united sees of Killala and Achonry were, under the provisions of the Irish Church Temporalities Act, added to the charge of Trench. By the same act, the archdiocese of Tuam was reduced, on Trench's death, to an ordinary bishopric.

In the history of the Irish church Trench chiefly deserves to be remembered for his activity in promoting the remarkable evangelical movement in the west of Ireland which was known in Connaught as the Second Reformation, and which, chiefly through the agency of the Irish Society, made a vigorous effort to win converts to Protestantism. From 1818 to his death Trench was president of the Irish Society; and it is evidence of his large-heartedness that the religious controversies in which his leadership of this movement involved no wise impaired the remarkable personal popularity which he enjoyed among his Roman Catholic neighbours. Holding strong views as to the paramount importance of the 'open bible,' Trench was a strenuous opponent of the mixed system of national education founded by Mr. Stanley (Lord Derby), and was one of the founders of the Church Education Society. Trench was a man of strong and masterful character, and during the twenty years of his archiepiscopate was one of the foremost figures in the Ireland of his day.

He died on 26 March 1839. Trench married, on 29 January 1795, his cousin Anne, daughter of Walter Taylor of Castle Taylor, co. Galway. By her, he had two sons, William and Power, and six daughters. Elizabeth, his third daughter, married Captain Henry Gascoyne in 1830. Another daughter Anne married James O'Hara, MP for Galway in 1823.

References

 
 
 
 
Attribution

 

1770 births
1839 deaths
People from County Galway
People educated at Harrow School
Bishops of Waterford and Lismore (Church of Ireland)
Anglican bishops of Elphin
Anglican archbishops of Tuam
Irish expatriates in the United Kingdom
Younger sons of earls
Members of the Privy Council of Ireland
Power
Irish Anglican archbishops